The Valorant Champions Tour (VCT) is a global competitive esports tournament series for the video game Valorant organised by Riot Games, the game's developers. The series runs multiple events throughout each season, culminating in Valorant Champions, the top-level event of the tour. The VCT was announced in 2020, with its inaugural season taking place in 2021.

History

2021–2022: Open-qualifiers era 
In November 2020, Riot Games announced the first Valorant Champions Tour, a tournament series divided into three tiers: Challengers, Masters, and Champions. Challengers would act as the lowest tier, split into six regions. Teams that advance past Challengers would move on to Masters, where teams would not be divided by regions anymore, and the top 16 teams from Masters would move on to Champions, the final tournament of VCT. In February 2021, they announced the VCT Game Changers, a supplementary tournament initiative for women and marginalized genders.

Riot hired esports infrastructure company Nerd Street Gamers to be the operators and producers for all North American Challengers and Masters events. They also hired several third-party companies to broadcast their events, such as Liga de Videojuegos Profesional (LVP) for their Spanish-language broadcasts and LetsPlay.Live for their Oceania broadcasts. The 2021 Champions tournament took place on December 1–12 at the Verti Music Hall in Berlin, Germany, concluding with team Acend defeating Gambit Esports in the grand finals by a score of 3–2.

Over 10,000 teams competed in the VCT in 2021. Outside of Champions, VCT saw its highest viewership at the Reykjavik Masters tournament in May, with a peak viewership of 1,085,850. The Champions grand finals match in December reached a peak viewership of 1,089,068, making it the VCT's highest peak viewership.

Riot made several changes to the format of VCT for its second iteration. While the overall structure of Challengers, Masters, and Champions remained unchanged, it reduced the number of stages of Challengers and Masters events from three to two. VCT Challengers began on February 11, 2022. The 2022 Champions tournament took place from September 1 to 18 in Istanbul, Turkey.

2023–present: Partnerships era 
Riot Games announced a new format starting in 2023. The season will be split into three international regions – Americas, EMEA and Pacific instead of the 7 regions format (NA, EMEA, Asia-Pacific, Korea, Japan, Brazil, and LATAM) used in previous years. Each international region will have own International League that replaces the Challengers to be come the domestic competitions to qualify for Masters and Champions. On September 21, 2022, Riot Games announced the thirty teams that had been selected as part of their new partnership format.

Format

International Leagues 
As of 2023, 30 teams are selected to be partner teams in International Leagues for five years with 10 teams per region. Teams compete in many sub-region's Challengers events to qualify for "Ascension" events. The Ascension events will have one winner per region, which earns them a two-year promotion into their regions' International League. The promoted teams will have chance to qualify for the global tournaments (Masters and Champions), as well as get benefits provided to other partnered teams. Each year through the Challengers promotion system, the three International Leagues will expand by one team each, until they reach a cap of 14 teams in each region in 2027 (42 teams in total).

Teams in International Leagues 
Teams in each International League will play on-LAN in a centralized local: Los Angeles for Americas League, Berlin for EMEA League and Seoul for Pacific League.

.

Global tournaments

Valorant Masters 
The Valorant Masters is an annual Valorant international tournament organized by Riot Games in the middle of years since 2021. It is the second most important international Valorant tournament aside from the Valorant Champions - the world championship in a year. Teams must finish at top places of their regional league in this stage to qualify for this Masters, and performance in Masters events will earn teams more circuit points than their regional league for advance directly to Champions events or at least qualify for the Last Chance Qualifer.

Valorant Champions 
The Valorant Champions is the annual professional Valorant world championship tournament hosted by Riot Games and is the culmination of each VCT season. Teams compete for the world champion title of Valorant's e-sports.

Valorant Game Changers 
Valorant Game Changers is a series of domestic competitions for women and other marginalized genders within Valorant esports. Teams finish at top places will qualify for the Valorant Game Changers Championship, a competition that is the world chapionship event of Game Changers series.

Result

International Leagues' winners

Global tournaments

Teams won titles 
 Team or organization no longer participates in Valorant esports.

 Team not currently partnered and competing in sub-regional Challengers or third-party competition.

Regions' titles

Valorant Game Changers Championship

Notes

References

External links 
 

 
Recurring sporting events established in 2020